The knockout stage of 2022 Copa América Femenina began on 24 July 2022 with the fifth place play-off and ended on 30 July 2022 with the final.

Format
In the knockout phase, if the final was level at the end of 90 minutes of normal playing time, extra time would be played (two periods of 15 minutes each), where each team would be allowed to make an extra substitution. If still tied after extra time, the match would be decided by a penalty shoot-out to determine the winners. In the fifth-place play-off, semi-finals and third-place play-off no extra time would be played and the match would be decided by a direct penalty shootout.

Qualified teams
The top two placed teams from each of the two groups qualified for the knockout stage.

Bracket

All times are local, COT (UTC−5).

Fifth place play-off
The winners of the fifth place match advanced to the inter-confederation play-offs.

Semi-finals
The winners of the semi-finals qualified for the 2023 FIFA Women's World Cup and the football tournament at the 2024 Summer Olympics.

Colombia vs Argentina

Brazil vs Paraguay

Third place play-off
The winners of the third place match qualified for the 2023 FIFA Women's World Cup. The losers advanced to the inter-confederation play-offs.

Final

References

External links

Knockout stage